The Legality Movement Party (PLL) is a right-wing monarchist political party in Albania lead by Shpetim Axhami. It supports the return to power of the House of Zogu under Crown Prince Leka of the Albanians. In the 2001 parliamentary election it was part of the Union for Victory (Bashkimi për Fitoren) coalition which received 37.1% of the vote and 46 members of parliament. In the 2021 election, the PLL won 2 parliamentary seats, with Andia Ulliri becoming the youngest member of the 32nd legislature of Albania.

PLL is member of the International Monarchist Conference.

Election Results

See also
 Legality Movement
 Zog of Albania
 Leka, Crown Prince of Albania (born 1939)
 Leka, Crown Prince of Albania (born 1982)
 Eqerem Spahia
 Skënder Zogu
 Albanian Democratic Monarchist Movement Party

References

External links
Official website
Facebook page

1924 establishments in Albania
Conservative parties in Albania
Monarchist parties
Monarchist parties in Albania
Political parties established in 1924
Social conservative parties